Condica cupentia, the splotched groundling, is a species of moth in the family Noctuidae (the owlet moths). It is found in North America.

The MONA or Hodges number for Condica cupentia is 9713.

References

Further reading

External links

 

Condicinae
Articles created by Qbugbot
Moths described in 1779